Mohamed Benhamou (Arabicمحمد بن حمو; born December 17, 1979) is an Algerian former professional footballer who played as a goalkeeper. He is the goalkeepers coach of USM Alger.

Playing career
Born in Paris, Benhamou began his career as a left-back at age 7 with Red Star Saint-Ouen.

Benhamou joined  after one season with AS Cannes in the French Championnat National (third division). Prior to signing with Cannes in the summer of 2006, he spent five seasons with Paris Saint-Germain. He has seven caps with the Algerian national team.

In January 2011, Benhamou signed a contract with ES Sétif.

Coaching career
From the summer 2018 to the summer 2019, Benhamou worked as a goalkeeper coach for US Lusitanos, where he also was available as a player. He made one appearance for the club in October 2018. In July 2019, he was hired by Emirati club Fujairah FC also as a goalkeeper coach. In August 2020, he was hired by USM Alger also as a goalkeeper coach.

Career statistics

Honours
Sétif
 Algerian Cup: 2011–12
 Algerian Ligue Professionnelle 1: 2011–12

References

External links
 
 
 
 
 

1979 births
Living people
Algerian footballers
Algeria international footballers
French sportspeople of Algerian descent
AS Cannes players
Paris Saint-Germain F.C. players
Red Star F.C. players
MC Alger players
MC Oran players
ES Sétif players
USM Annaba players
ES Viry-Châtillon players
US Lusitanos Saint-Maur players
Algerian Ligue Professionnelle 1 players
Championnat National 2 players
Footballers from Paris
2004 African Cup of Nations players
Association football goalkeepers